Pip Carter is an English actor.

Career
He attended Sir Joseph Williamson's Mathematical School in Rochester, Kent. Before starting his professional career, Carter trained at the Royal Academy of Dramatic Art (RADA) where he appeared in productions of The Cosmonaut's Last Message..., Platonov, In the Jungle of Cities, The Good Soldier and Assassins.

Theatre
Carter's work in theatre includes: Present Laughter and The Hour We Knew Nothing of Each Other at the National Theatre, London. He also appeared in Howard Brenton's new play, Never So Good at the National Theatre, London., David Hare's new play Gethsemane, also at the National Theatre, for which he was nominated as Best Supporting Actor in a Play in the Whatsonstage Theatregoers Choice Awards and in The White Guard at the National Theatre, London and Joseph K at the Gate Theatre, London. He appeared in Nina Raine's Tiger Country at the Hampstead Theatre in early 2011 and from November 2011 to January 2012 as Edward Thomas in Nick Dear's biographical play The Dark Earth and the Light Sky.

In 2016 he appeared as Sergei Voynitzev in Platonov and Medvedenko in The Seagull in the Young Chekhov season  at the National Theatre. In 2017 he appeared in the premiere production of Consent at the Royal National Theatre, London.

Television
On television he has appeared in Party Animals (BBC Two) and John Adams (HBO). In 2011 he appeared as Wystan - the poet W. H. Auden - in BBC Two's drama Christopher and His Kind about Christopher Isherwood's time in Berlin in the 1930s. In 2014, he played Freddy Lagarde in Salting the Battlefield. In 2017 he appeared in The Crown as Colin Tennant.

References

External links
 
 Pip Carter's page at Troika

English male stage actors
People educated at Sir Joseph Williamson's Mathematical School
English male television actors
Living people
Year of birth missing (living people)
Male actors from Kent
Alumni of RADA